Wampler is a surname. Notable people with the surname include:

Fred Wampler (Congressman) (1909–1999), U.S. Representative from Indiana
Fred Wampler (golfer) (1923–1985), American professional golfer who played on the PGA Tour and the Senior PGA Tour
William C. Wampler (1926–2012), United States Representative from Virginia
William C. Wampler, Jr. (born 1959), American politician, elected to the Senate of Virginia in 1988
William C. "Will" Wampler III (born 1991), member of the Virginia House of Delegates
 Wampler Pedals, manufacturer of guitar effects pedals